A massive fireball was recorded above Siberia, near Yekaterinburg, on November 14, 2014. The explosion apparently happened near the city of Rezh.

Various explanations have been proposed. The Russian Ministry for Emergency Situations said it was a ground explosion, but the Siberian Times, a local newspaper, reported that "the light was not accompanied by any sound". Regarding the meteoroid hypothesis, the Siberian Times also reported that "a local observatory indicated nothing fell from the sky on the day of the flash". Another hypothesis that was raised is that it was a high-altitude nuclear explosion.

See also
Chelyabinsk meteor, 15 February 2013, also seen in Yekaterinburg

References

Earth mysteries
History of Siberia
Suspected nuclear weapons testing